Oppenheimer is the debut album by Belfast indie-pop duo Oppenheimer. It was released in the United States and Canada in June 2006 through Bar/None Records and in the UK in March 2007 through Smalltown America.

Background and recording
Shaun Robinson and Rocky O'Reilly composed the songs from Oppenheimer between 2004 and 2006. They were signed to Bar/None Records in 2005, after sending an unsolicited demo to the label via email. Several tracks from the album, including "Breakfast in NYC" and "Allen Died April 5", were recorded in O'Reilly's home in Belfast. O'Reilly describes their gear setup at the time as comprising "two guitars, some cheap keyboards and a cheap microphone". Belfast DJ David Holmes loaned the band some additional recording equipment. The band was also joined by Tim Wheeler of the Northern Irish alternative group Ash. Wheeler, a childhood friend of Robinson, provided lead vocals on "Orchid".

Reception

Oppenheimer received generally positive reviews from critics. In a review for Drowned in Sound, Francis Jones called the album "pithy and precise", and observed that the "honeyed vocals and saccharine-slathered synth" belie the lyrical themes of heartache. However, Jones cited "Okay, Let's Take This Outside" and "Orchid" as low points for the album.

Track listing
All songs written by Oppenheimer, except where noted.
 "This Is Not a Test"
 "This Is a Test"
 "Breakfast in NYC"
 "Okay, Let's Take This Outside"
 "My Son, the Astronaut"
 "When I Close My Eyes I Fall in Love"
 "Allen Died, April Five"
 "Nine Words"
 "M.O."
 "Don't Call Me" 
 "Time Loss/Gain"
 "Orchid"
 "Saturday Looks Bad to Me"
 "This Kiss When"

Personnel
Oppenheimer
Shaun Robinson
Rocky O'Reilly

Additional musicians
Anna Fitzsimmons – additional vocals
Tim Wheeler – vocals on "Orchid"

Production
John Marshall Smith – mastering

References

2006 debut albums
Oppenheimer (band) albums
Bar/None Records albums